Ivan Ribać (born 11 March 1977) is a boxer, sports instructor, administrator, and politician in Serbia. He was elected to the National Assembly of Serbia in the 2020 Serbian parliamentary election as a member of the Serbian Progressive Party.

Early career
Both Ivan and his brother Dejan Ribać were members of Serbia's national boxing team. Ivan participated several international boxing events, including the 2004 European Amateur Boxing Championships in Pula, Croatia, where he scored victories over world amateur champion John Dovi and Olympic medalist Rudolf Kraj. His boxing career was ultimately cut short by a broken arm. He subsequently became the director of Serbia's department for the suppression of smuggling, and in September 2018 he was appointed as an assistant director in customs administration.

The Ribać brothers have established both the Association for Martial Arts Fans and the Braća Ribać training center in Belgrade. A 2019 profile in Novosti noted that the center was providing a training program for children living with special needs.

Politician
Ribać received the thirty-sixth position on the Serbian Progressive Party's Aleksandar Vučić — For Our Children electoral list in the 2020 Serbian parliamentary election and was elected to the assembly when the list won a landslide majority with 188 mandates. He is a member of the defence and internal affairs committee, a deputy member of the committee on Kosovo-Metohija and the culture and information committee, and a member of the parliamentary friendship groups with the Bahamas, Botswana, Cameroon, the Central African Republic, Comoros, the Dominican Republic, Ecuador, Equatorial Guinea, Eritrea, Grenada, Guinea-Bissau, Israel, Italy, Jamaica, Kyrgyzstan, Laos, Liberia, Madagascar, Mali, Mauritius, Mozambique, Nauru, the Netherlands, Nicaragua, Nigeria, Palau, Papua New Guinea, Paraguay, the Republic of Congo, Saint Vincent and the Grenadines, Sao Tome and Principe, the Solomon Islands, South Sudan, Sri Lanka, Sudan, Suriname, Togo, Trinidad and Tobago, the United States of America, Uruguay, and Uzbekistan.

References

1977 births
Living people
Politicians from Belgrade
Serbian boxers
Members of the National Assembly (Serbia)
Serbian Progressive Party politicians